Lake Luzerne is the primary hamlet and a census-designated place (CDP) within the town of Lake Luzerne, Warren County, New York, United States. As of the 2010 census, the population was 1,227, out of 3,347 residents in the entire town of Lake Luzerne. Before that, the community was part of the Lake Luzerne-Hadley census-designated place.

Lake Luzerne CDP is in southern Warren County, in the western part of its town. It is named for Lake Luzerne, a water body on the east side of the hamlet. The community is bordered to the west by the Hudson River, across which is the town of Hadley in Saratoga County. The Luzerne Music Center is on the east side of the lake.

New York State Route 9N passes through Lake Luzerne, leading northeast  to Lake George and south  to Saratoga Springs.

Demographics

References 

Census-designated places in Warren County, New York
Census-designated places in New York (state)